The Monumento a los Niños Héroes is a monument in Guadalajara, in the Mexican state of Jalisco. The monument is located in a roundabout that was later intervened by activists, who symbolically renamed it as the Glorieta de las y los desaparecidos.

References

Monuments and memorials in Jalisco
Obelisks
Outdoor sculptures in Guadalajara
Sculptures of men in Mexico
Statues in Jalisco